Sugar, Honey and Pepper (Italian: Zucchero, miele e peperoncino) is a 1980 Italian comedy film directed by Sergio Martino.

Plot 
The film includes three segments.
 "Zucchero": Due to a mugshot exchange, the insurance agent Valerio Milanese is mistaken for Matteo Pugliese, a dangerous murderer. A sexy journalist wanting a scoop ends up worsening the position of the man. 
 "Miele": Giuseppe Mazzarelli, a graduate unable to find a job, disguises himself as a woman and gets hired as a maid.
 "Peperoncino": Taxi driver Plinio Carlozzi is involved in a kidnapping by a Sicilian Mafia clan for the purpose of a forced marriage.

Cast 

 Lino Banfi: Valerio Milanese 
 Edwige Fenech: Amalia Passalacqua
 Pippo Franco: Giuseppe Mazzarelli
 Dagmar Lassander: Mara Mencacci
 Renato Pozzetto: Plinio Carlozzi
 Enzo Robutti: Inspector Genovese
 Patrizia Garganese: Rosalia Mancuso
 Glauco Onorato: Duilio Mencacci 
 Gianfranco Barra: Judge 
 Sal Borgese: Alfio
 Sandro Ghiani: Saruzzo
 Franca Scagnetti: Mother of Rosalia 
 Elio Crovetto: Scarnicchia  
 Renzo Marignano: Aurelio Battistini

References

External links

1980 films
Italian comedy films
1980 comedy films
Films directed by Sergio Martino
Films scored by Detto Mariano
Cross-dressing in film
1980s Italian films